Bark Seghiri (born August 8, 1978 in Argenteuil, Val-d'Oise) is a French-born Algerian football player who last played as a defender for Panserraikos in the Greek Football League.

Career
He started his career at FC Istres in France. He had also played for ES Wasquehal, Iraklis in Greece and APOEL in Cyprus. During his spell with APOEL, he won two Championships, one Cup and one Super Cup.

International career
Seghiri represented France at the Under-18 level. However, being of Algerian origin, he was pre-selected four times by the Algerian National Team but never received a full call-up.

Honours
 APOEL
 Cypriot League: 2
 2006-07, 2008-09
 Cypriot Cup: 1
2008
 Cypriot Super Cup: 1
 2008

References

External links
Stats

1978 births
Living people
Sportspeople from Argenteuil
French sportspeople of Algerian descent
Algerian footballers
Algerian expatriate footballers
Iraklis Thessaloniki F.C. players
Panserraikos F.C. players
Racing Club de France Football players
Paris Saint-Germain F.C. players
APOEL FC players
FC Istres players
Expatriate footballers in Cyprus
Expatriate footballers in Greece
Ligue 2 players
Super League Greece players
Cypriot First Division players
Algerian expatriate sportspeople in Cyprus
Association football defenders
Wasquehal Football players
Footballers from Val-d'Oise